NASL Final 1970 was the North American Soccer League's postseason championship final of the 1970 season. As no championship game was played for the 1969 season, it was the first championship game since the 1968 season. The event was contested in a two-game aggregate match between the Rochester Lancers and the Washington Darts. The first leg was held on September 5, 1970 at Aquinas Memorial Stadium in Rochester, New York, with the Lancers victorious by a score of 3–0. The second leg was played on September 13, 1970 at Brookland Stadium in Washington, D.C. That day the Darts came out on top by the score of 3–1. Renato Costa, who played under the alias of "Raul Herrera" that year, scored three of Rochester's four goals. With the two-day competition completed, the Rochester Lancers held a 4–3 aggregate lead and were crowned the 1970 NASL champions.

Background

The Rochester Lancers and the Washington Darts respectively won the Northern Division and Southern Division of the NASL.  This earned each team the right to compete for the league title.

Series summary

Match details

First leg

Second leg 

 

Notes

1970 NASL Champions: Rochester Lancers

See also 
 1970 North American Soccer League season

References 

1970
 
1970
September 1970 sports events in the United States
1970 in sports in New York (state)
1970 in sports in Washington, D.C.
Soccer in Washington, D.C.
Sports competitions in Washington, D.C.
Sports in Rochester, New York
Soccer in New York (state)